An Arizona state park is an area of land in the U.S. state of Arizona preserved by the state for its natural, cultural, or recreational resources. The state park system in Arizona includes both state parks and state historic parks, as well as other designations such as natural areas and recreation areas. Arizona currently has 31 state park units, which are managed wholly or partly by the Arizona State Parks government agency.  In 2010 several Arizona state parks were closed due to budget cuts.  Some have since reopened thanks to support in the form of donations and partnerships with local agencies.

List

See also
List of U.S. national parks

Notes

References

External links
Arizona State Parks

 
State parks
Arizona state parks
Environment of Arizona
Protected areas of Arizona
Tourist attractions in Arizona